David Watts is a professor of anthropology at Yale University.

As a physical anthropologist he has studied  chimpanzees.  He directed the Karisoke Research Center in Rwanda founded by Dian Fossey for two years, and is  doing research on chimpanzees in a long term study at Ngogo National Park in Uganda.

External links
PBS Deep Jungle: Meet the Scientists: David Watts
Yale University > Anthropology > Faculty > David P. Watts

Watts, David P.
Watts, David P.
Year of birth missing (living people)